XML validation is the process of checking a document written in XML (eXtensible Markup Language) to confirm that it is both well-formed and also "valid" in that it follows a defined structure. A well-formed document follows the basic syntactic rules of XML, which are the same for all XML documents. A valid document also respects the rules dictated by a particular DTD or XML schema. Automated tools – validators – can perform well-formedness tests and many other validation tests, but not those that require human judgement, such as correct application of a schema to a data set.

Standards 

 OASIS CAM is a standard specification that provides contextual validation of content and structure that is more flexible than basic schema validations.
 Schematron, a method for advanced XML validation.

Tools 

 xmllint is a command line XML tool that can perform XML validation. It can be found in UNIX / Linux environments.
 XML toolkit. The XML C parser and toolkit of Gnome – libxml includes xmllint
 XML Validator Online Validate your XML data.
 XML Schema Validator Validate XML files against an XML Schema.

References

 Articles discussing XML validation
DEVX March, 2009 - Taking XML Validation to the Next Level: Introducing CAM

XML
Data modeling languages